PYTHIA is a computer simulation program for particle collisions at very high energies (see event (particle physics)) in particle accelerators.

History
PYTHIA was originally written in FORTRAN 77, until the 2007 release of PYTHIA 8.1 which was rewritten in C++. Both the Fortran and C++ versions were maintained until 2012 because not all components had been merged into the 8.1 version. However, the latest version already includes new features not available in the Fortran release. PYTHIA is developed and maintained by an international collaboration of physicists, consisting of Christian Bierlich, Nishita Desai, Leif Gellersen, Ilkka Helenius, Philip Ilten, Leif Lönnblad, Stephen Mrenna, Stefan Prestel, Christian Preuss, Torbjörn Sjöstrand, Peter Skands, Marius Utheim and Rob Verheyen.

Features
The following is a list of some of the features PYTHIA is capable of simulating:
 Hard and soft interactions
 Parton distributions
 Initial/final-state parton showers
 Multiparton interactions
 Fragmentation and decay

See also
 Particle physics
 Particle decay

References

Further reading

External links
 The official PYTHIA page

Monte Carlo particle physics software
Physics software
Software that was rewritten in C++